The 1892 United States presidential election in Maryland took place on November 8, 1892. All contemporary 44 states were part of the 1892 United States presidential election. State voters chose eight electors to the Electoral College, which selected the president and vice president.

Maryland was won by the Democratic nominees, former President Grover Cleveland of New York and his running mate Adlai Stevenson I of Illinois. Democrats would not win the popular vote in Maryland again until 1912.

Results

Results by county

Counties that flipped from Republican to Democratic
Anne Arundel
Caroline
Frederick
Washington

See also
 United States presidential elections in Maryland
 1892 United States presidential election
 1892 United States elections

Notes

References 

Maryland
1892
Presidential